is a railway station on the Kyūdai Main Line operated by JR Kyūshū, in Ukiha, Fukuoka Prefecture, Japan.

Lines 
Only local trains on the line stop at the station.

Layout 
The station consists of two side platforms serving two tracks at grade. Two sidings branch off track 1. The station is a modern structure but built in a traditional Japanese style with white plaster namako walls to recall the white plaster traditional houses which are a tourist attraction in Yoshii town nearby. The station building houses a waiting room and a ticket window. Access to the opposite side platform is by means of a footbridge.

Management of the station has been outsourced to the JR Kyushu Tetsudou Eigyou Co., a wholly owned subsidiary of JR Kyushu specialising in station services. It staffs the ticket counter which is equipped with a POS machine but does not have a Midori no Madoguchi facility.

History
Japanese Government Railways (JGR) opened  on 24 December 1928 as the eastern terminus of a track from  during the first phase of the construction of the Kyudai Main Line. With the privatization of Japanese National Railways (JNR), the successor of JGR, on 1 April 1987, JR Kyushu took over control of the station.

Passenger statistics
In fiscal 2016, the station was used by an average of 549 passengers daily (boarding passengers only), and it ranked 233ed among the busiest stations of JR Kyushu.

Surrounding area
Yoshii town traditional houses. A group of traditional buildings built with namako white plaster walls for fire-proofing in a style known as dozo dzukuri. The district is located near the station and has been officially classified as an Important Preservation District for Groups of Traditional Buildings.

References

External links
Chikugo-Yoshii (JR Kyushu)

Railway stations in Fukuoka Prefecture
Stations of Kyushu Railway Company
Railway stations in Japan opened in 1928